Lawrence Gray was an actor.

Lawrence Gray may also refer to:

Lawrence Gray (singer)
Laurie Gray

See also
Lawrence Grey (disambiguation)